Melissa Wijfje (born 21 July 1995) is a Dutch allround speed skater who is specialized in the middle and long distances.

Career

In 2015 Wijfje won the ISU World Junior Speed Skating Championships in Warsaw, Poland after winning the 1500 and 3000 m events. Additionally she won the gold medal at the team pursuit event with Sanneke de Neeling and Esmee Visser.

Wijfje finished third at the ISU World Cup 5000 m event in Heerenveen in December 2016, her first career World Cup medal.

She was a member of Team JustLease and when that team folded became part of Team Talentned. She presently skaats for Team Zaanlander.

Personal records

As of 23 January 2022, Wijfje was placed 15th on the adelskalender with a points total of 158.148.

Tournament overview

Source:

 ** Overall classification determined for allrounders

World Cup overview

Source:

– = Did not participate
* = 5000m
(b) = Division B
 DNF = Did not finish
 GWC = Grand World Cup

References

External links
 
 

1995 births
Living people
Dutch female speed skaters
People from Nieuwkoop
World Single Distances Speed Skating Championships medalists
Sportspeople from South Holland
21st-century Dutch women